Happiness is the debut studio album by English musical duo Hurts. It was released on 27 August 2010 by RCA Records. It was preceded by the release of the singles "Better Than Love" on 23 May 2010 and "Wonderful Life" on 22 August 2010. Collaborators include Jonas Quant and production team The Nexus, as well as a duet with Australian singer Kylie Minogue on the song "Devotion". To promote the release of the album, the track "Happiness" was made available as a free download via Amazon.co.uk on 1 August 2010.

Happiness received mixed reviews from music critics. The album debuted at number four on the UK Albums Chart, selling 25,493 copies in its first week—the fastest-selling debut album of 2010 by a band in the United Kingdom. It reached number one on the Greek International Albums Chart, number two in Austria, Germany, Poland and Switzerland, and the top ten in Denmark, Finland, Ireland and Sweden. Happiness has sold 180,218 copies in the United Kingdom and over two million copies worldwide.

Singles
"Better Than Love" was released as the lead single on 23 May 2010 in the United Kingdom. It spent one week at number 50 on the UK Singles Chart, and charted in Belgium, the Czech Republic and the Netherlands.

The second single, "Wonderful Life", was released on 22 August 2010 in the United Kingdom. It was previously released as the band's debut single in Denmark on 3 May 2010. According to lead singer Theo Hutchcraft, the song is about two extremes, "the first being a man who wants to kill himself and the second being love at first sight." The song debuted at number 21 in the United Kingdom, and peaked at number two in Germany. It reached the top 10 in Austria, Denmark and Switzerland.

"Stay" was released as the third single on 15 November 2010, and peaked at number 50 on the UK Singles Chart on 21 November 2010.

"All I Want for Christmas Is New Year's Day" was released as the fourth single on 13 December 2010 from the Deluxe edition bonus tracks in Happiness.

"Sunday" was released as the fifth single on 27 February 2011.

The album's sixth single, "Illuminated", was released on 1 May 2011 as a double A-side with a re-release of "Better Than Love".

"Blood, Tears & Gold" was released exclusively in Germany, Austria and Switzerland on 7 October 2011 as the album's seventh and final single.

Critical reception

Happiness received mixed reviews from music critics. At Metacritic, which assigns a normalised rating out of 100 to reviews from mainstream critics, the album received an average score of 58, based on 9 reviews. Alexis Petridis of The Guardian wrote, "You get the feeling Hurts have spent more time making their backstory interesting than their music", and that on some tracks lead singer Hutchcraft sounds like "one of those puppets that advertises Dolmio, but in the throes of a romantic crisis". Dorian Lynskey of Q magazine also gave a mixed review, stating that the duo "learn all the wrong lessons from the 80s" and calling the album "a depressingly ordinary package of overblown melodies and musty lyrical cliches [...], expensively ribboned with choirs and orchestras." Teddy Jamieson of The Herald noticed that the band has "an ear for a hook, but Happiness feels very synthetic (and not in a fun, sci-fi way)" and that "beneath the synthy exterior lurk orthodox song structures, big choruses and a join-every-dot desperation for pop stardom", however he felt that "there are a couple of flashes of wit and intelligence buried in the album". Andrzej Lukowski of Drowned in Sound complimented the singles "Wonderful Life" and "Better Than Love", but felt that elsewhere the record is not "desperately fun" and found "the music thin" and "the embellishments desperately gauche".

Andy Gill of The Independent dubbed the album "efficient and stylish", but felt it "lacks innovation: music that moisturises a touch too much." Fiona Shepherd from The Scotsman said that the duo "look and sound out of time – and they probably like it that way" and described the album as "urbane but banal pop" with an occasional "21st century reference". Sam Shepherd of musicOMH stated that "there's a melancholy seam that runs throughout the album that, in conjunction with the polished production, succeeds in achieving a glacial grandeur to each of these songs" and noticed that "appalling ballads in the shape of 'The Water' and 'Unspoken' will almost certainly be overlooked in favour of the classy sounds of 'Wonderful Life' or the glorious pulsing anthem of 'Better Than Love'". Simon Gage of the Daily Express felt that the songs are "thoughtful, melancholy and very modern" and noticed that the album has "a real sense of style that's been missing in British pop for some time". Luke Lewis of NME praised the songs as "fearsomely well-crafted" and "as clean-lined and immaculate as a well-cut suitwrote" and described the album as "billowing, escapist nonsense that raises your heart rate, slaps a smile on your face and sounds godlike when drunk". Joe Copplestone of PopMatters said that the duo sings "simple lyrical messages of love, pain and yearning that most pop acts could not deliver sincerely if they tried" and claimed that they "have probably released the 'coolest' album of the year", giving it nine out of ten.

Track listing

Notes
  signifies an additional producer

Personnel
Credits adapted from the liner notes of Happiness.

Musicians

 Hurts – programming ; instruments 
 Jonas Quant – programming ; instruments ; keyboards 
 The Nexus – programming, instruments 
 Stephen Kozmeniuk – guitars ; additional guitars 
 Paulo Mendonça – backing vocals, choir ; intro guitars 
 Hilary Marsden – saxophone, clarinet 
 Salome Kent – violin 
 Tina Sunnero – choir 
 Jennifer Götvall – choir 
 Karianne Arvidsson – choir 
 Malin Abrahamsson – choir 
 Johan Håkansson – drums 
 Joseph Cross – all instruments, programming 
 Kylie Minogue – additional vocals 
 Simon Hale – string arrangements, string conducting 
 The London Studio Orchestra – strings 
 Perry Montague-Mason – orchestra leader

Technical

 Hurts – production
 Jonas Quant – production ; additional production 
 The Nexus – additional production 
 Joseph Cross – production 
 Stephen Kozmeniuk – engineering 
 Niall Acott – string recording 
 Mark "Spike" Stent – mixing
 Matt Green – mixing assistance
 George Marino – mastering at Sterling Sound, New York City

Artwork

 Samuel Muir – design, "Silver Lining" illustration
 Laurence Ellis – cover photography
 Katja Ruge – Hurts live image
 Ali Tollervey – "Better Than Love" photo
 Pauly Spooner – "Sunday" photo
 Lindsay Bull – "Illuminated" painting

Charts

Weekly charts

Year-end charts

Certifications

Release history

Notes

References

2010 debut albums
Hurts albums
RCA Records albums